Jasilyn Charger (born May 20, 1996) is a member of the Cheyenne River Sioux Tribe, from Eagle Butte, South Dakota, USA. Charger is a land activist, water protector, community organizer, and advocate for Native American and LGBTQ rights, and a youth founder of the Dakota Access Pipeline protests. They have also protested against the Keystone Pipeline, and were arrested for their non-violent civil disobedience in November 2020.

Charger co-founded the One Mind Youth Movement, International Indigenous Youth Council, and Seventh Defenders; and is a part of the Warrior Women Project.

Early life 
Charger was born and raised on the Cheyenne River Indian Reservation, in South Dakota, USA. They learned about activism from relatives who opposed a uranium mine, and learned indigenous traditions from their mother. Their father died two months before they were born. Charger has 15 half-siblings, and one full sibling, their twin sister, Jasilea Charger. Their paternal grandfather, Harry Charger, was chief of the Itazipco band.

In 2009, the Department of Social Services placed 13-year-old Charger in mental health facilities after they had spent years in foster care homes. They didn't see their family again until they turned 18.

Charger returned home in 2014. Many suicides, murders and funerals took place in their community that year, and addiction and violence were rampant among youth. Charger was homeless and despondent until they were helped by Chief David Bald Eagle. After a friend's suicide in 2015, Charger and two friends founded the One Mind Youth Movement, which encouraged young people to care for each other. Charger believed that a safe space and activism would teach children survival skills to avoid bullying and drug abuse.

Activism

Keystone Pipeline 
In November 2015, Charger attended the Our Generation, Our Choice rally in Washington, D.C. to demand that politicians address racial, immigration and climate justice. Charger delivered a speech: "We're tired, we've had enough," they said. "The murders, the suicides – we're losing our future, but we're here to make a change."

Dakota Access Pipeline 
In April 2016, Charger, the One Mind Youth Movement and some experienced Keystone Pipeline activists established Sacred Stone Camp, the first small prayer camp in Cannon Ball, North Dakota, on the Standing Rock Sioux Reservation. Ladonna Brave-Bull Allard, who made space for the camp on her land, gave a speech that inspired Charger. This camp was a first step to block construction of the pipeline.

At Standing Rock, the youths felt they would be able to overcome trauma. Charger explained the importance of letting history go. "We don't want our children to inherit this depression," they said. The International Indigenous Youth Council, co-founded by Charger, was the first family-like experience for many of the kids. The Indigenous Environmental Network (I.E.N.) paid for Charger to go to Washington to be trained as an organizer. "Who better to speak for the past than the voice of the future?" said Charger.

In July 15 and August, 2016, 30 activists, including Charger and their twin sister Jasilea, participated in a 2,000-mile relay race from Sacred Stone camp to Washington, D.C. to bring attention to the protests and deliver a petition with more than 140,000 signatures against the pipeline.  The run was organized by ReZpect Our Water and Octei Sakowin Youth and allies. Running to deliver an important message is a Native American custom. The fastest runners pass the messages like the baton in a relay race to deliver it as quickly as possible. About 20 runners completed the entire distance. Divergent actress and activist Shailene Woodley participated in the relay. The petition, on Change.org, eventually acquired 559,237 signatures.

The group ran for 22 days, arriving on August 5 and were allowed to meet with the Army Corps of Engineers, the Bureau of Indian Affairs, and a two-star general. The Dakota Access Pipeline received international attention.

"I run for every man, woman and child that was, that is, and for those who will come to be... I run for my life, because I want to live. ... It's a system designed to let things slip through the cracks, but it's up to us to hold our government accountable. Our land is in danger, as well as our identity, but we will not stand in silence ... We are rising from this dilemma and uniting nations that have been separate for generations. We must take advantage of this chance to make a change." said Charger. In an interview with Democracy Now! they stated: "If the youth can ... work with other youth from different places and not know them personally and do this run ….and stand together in this fight, the elders, the adults, can do that, too"

In September 2016, Chief Arvol Looking Horse gave the youths a chanupa, a sacred ceremonial pipe that is a symbol of interwoven human community and nature, ancestors and living. Most importantly, the council declared the youth to be akicita, or "warriors for the people".

In December 2016, the pipeline's needed easement was denied by the Army Corps of Engineers. David Archambault II, the chairman of the Standing Rock tribal government, thanked the runners for their activism. "When the youth ran to D.C., that's when this really got started."

Return to Eagle Butte 
When Standing Rock disbanded in early 2017, Charger returned to Eagle Butte, couch-surfing with friends. They were pregnant but miscarried their son, and became depressed and suicidal. His death and burial reinforced their determination to protect the earth. They then decided to use their insights to engage in suicide prevention work as well as organize against the Keystone Pipeline.

Roots Camp and more Keystone Pipeline protests 
Charger and other tribal members formed Roots Camp, a small protest camp on the Cheyenne River Indian Reservation. The camp members intend to stay put until all infrastructure related to the Keystone Pipeline is removed from an area of land near the reservation that belongs by treaty to the Lakota people, but was seized by settlers and the federal government.

Charger locked themself to a pump station in November 2020. They were charged with trespassing, a class 1 misdemeanor. and faced up to a year in prison for an act of non-violent civil disobedience. Represented by the Lakota People's Law Project, Charger, pled no contest and agreed to six months probation and $518 in fines, in exchange for no jail time.

In December 2020, Charger was a featured speaker in the Indigenous Womxn Fighting Pipelines webinar, presented by the Indigenous Environmental Network.

The Keystone Pipeline was officially cancelled on June 9, 2021.

Recognition 
Teen Vogue’s Water Warriors - April 2017

MIT News MIT Media Lab’s Disobedience Award - Honorable Mention - July 2017

How Stuff Works (History): Five times young people changed the world - 2018

The Guardian: The Frederick Douglass 200 -  February 2019

Rolling Stone: Children of the Climate Crisis - March 2020

Ms. Magazine Book Review: How we go home - a collection of twelve oral histories by Indigenous people from across Canada and the United States. - Nov 2020

Personal life 
Charger has publicly come out as non-binary and uses they/them pronouns. They particularly identify as two-spirit. They have also been open about being bisexual.

See also 

 Dakota Access Pipeline protests
 Dakota Access Pipeline protests - indigenous youth activists
 Keystone Pipeline - protests and opposition

References

External links 

 On the Front Lines of Activism

1996 births
Living people
Two-spirit people
Bisexual non-binary people
Cheyenne River Sioux people
American LGBT rights activists
American political activists
Community activists
Native American environmentalists